The Perm electoral district was a constituency created for the 1917 Russian Constituent Assembly election. The electoral district covered the Perm Governorate.

The Peasants Union, with more than 13,000 votes, was mainly based in Krasnoufimsk uezd.

Results

References

Electoral districts of the Russian Constituent Assembly election, 1917